Bonaventure, a French name (from Latin Bonaventura, meaning "good fortune") may refer to:

People

Given name
 Saint Bonaventure (John of Fidanza) (1221–1274), Italian philosopher and theologian
 Pseudo-Bonaventure, a name given to various anonymous medieval writers whose writings were previously attributed to Saint Bonaventure
 Bonaventure of Siena (fl. 1264–1266), Italian notary and translator
 Bonaventure de Bar (1700–1729), French painter
 Bonaventure Baron (1610–1696), Irish Franciscan theologian, philosopher and writer of Latin prose and verse
 Bonaventure Broderick (1868–1943), the Coadjutor Bishop of the Archdiocese of San Cristóbal de la Habana
 Bonaventura Cavalieri (1598–1647), Italian mathematician 
 Bonaventure Elzevir (1583–1652), Dutch publisher and printer
 Bonaventure Giffard (1642–1734), English Roman Catholic bishop
 Bonaventure Hepburn (1573–1620/1), Scottish linguist and biblical scholar
 Bonaventura Hussey (Maelbrighte Ó Hussey) (died 1614), Irish Franciscan author
 Bonaventure Kalou (born 1978), Ivorian footballer
 Bonaventure Maruti (born 1976), a Kenyan football striker
 Bonaventure Panet (1765–1846), a businessman and politician in Lower Canada
 Bonaventure Patrick Paul (1929–2007), Pakistani bishop of the Roman Catholic Diocese of Hyderabad
 Bonaventure des Périers (c. 1501–1544), French author
 Bonaventura (given name), Italian given name

Surname
 Bonaventura (surname), Italian surname
 Simon-Pierre Denys de Bonaventure (1659–1711), French officer in the colonial navy of New France
 Ysaline Bonaventure, Belgian tennis player

Places

Canada
 Bonaventure Regional County Municipality, Quebec
 City of Bonaventure, Quebec, in the Bonaventure RCM
 Bonaventure Airport, serving City of Bonaventure
 Bonaventure River
 Bonaventure Island in the Gaspésie region on the Gulf of St. Lawrence
 Bonaventure (electoral district), a former federal electoral district
 Bonaventure (provincial electoral district), a Quebec provincial electoral district
 Place Bonaventure in Montreal which gave its name to
 Bonaventure (Montreal Metro) station
 Bonaventure Station, railway station in downtown Montreal, Quebec
 Autoroute Bonaventure (Quebec Autoroute 10), also called the Bonaventure Expressway
 Old and New Bonaventure, Newfoundland and Labrador, small communities

United States
 St. Bonaventure, New York, a census-designated place and community in Allegany
 Westin Bonaventure Hotel, the largest hotel in Los Angeles, California
 Bonaventure Cemetery in Savannah, Georgia
 Bonaventure Plantation in Savannah, Georgia

Latvia
 Bonaventuras iela (Bonaventura street), Riga, Latvia

Entertainment
 Bonaventure, a play that was made into the 1951 film Thunder on the Hill

Schools
 Saint Bonaventure's College in Newfoundland, Canada
 St. Bonaventure University, located in Allegany, New York, United States
 St Bonaventure's Catholic School, in Forest Gate, London Borough of Newham, United Kingdom
 St Bonaventure's High School, a school located in Hyderabad, Sindh province, Pakistan
 St. Bonaventure High School, a private, Catholic, co-educational secondary school in Ventura, California, United States
 St. Bonaventure Elementary School, a Catholic elementary school in Toronto, Ontario

Ships
 Canadian aircraft carrier, 
 nine warships of the Royal Navy have been named HMS Bonaventure

Other
 Bonaventure station (disambiguation), stations of the name

See also 
 Buenaventura (disambiguation)
 Bonaventura (disambiguation)